The Double V campaign was a drive to promote the fight for democracy in overseas campaigns and at the home front in the United States for African Americans during World War II. The Double V refers to the "V for victory" sign prominently displayed by countries fighting "for victory over aggression, slavery, and tyranny," but adopts a second "V" to represent the double victory for African Americans fighting for freedom overseas and at home. The campaign first appeared in the African-American newspaper Pittsburgh Courier on February 7, 1942. The Courier was the most highly circulated black newspaper during the war, with a readership of around 350,000. Other black newspapers followed suit and adopted the campaign, including the Chicago Defender and the Amsterdam Star-News.  The slogan was prompted by a response to the letter, "Should I Sacrifice to Live 'Half American? written by 26-year-old reader James G. Thompson. It was also a response to Franklin D. Roosevelt, who had encouraged five editors of the top black newspapers in the United States to reduce the discontent and apathy of their readers toward the war.   

Pitched as "Democracy – Double Victory, At Home – Abroad", the campaign highlighted the risks black soldiers and civilians took while participating in America's struggle against the Axis powers while being denied their rights as full American citizens back home. African-American soldiers fighting abroad in the Second World War were still subject to segregation within the armed forces, despite fighting on land that did not hold the same racist ideology as that which they experienced at home and during their service. It was not until July 28, 1948, when President Harry S. Truman put forth Executive Order 9981, that the armed forces were racially integrated.   

Among African-Americans, the Double V campaign had a 91% approval rating and was supported by various institutions and organizations, such as North Carolina A&T State University and United Automobile Workers. Support for the campaign was bolstered by wartime events such as the Port Chicago disaster and Agana race riot, which underscored the disparities black soldiers faced. The campaign also played a role at home in encouraging defense industries to hire African-American employees who left the South in large numbers for the urban North and West Coast during the Second Great Migration to help the nation's war effort.

Response to African Americans in the Second World War
After the Japanese attack at the American naval base in Pearl Harbor, America sent in the 369th Division to defend the territory of Hawaii from air attacks. Response from Hawaiians towards the African American soldiers varied greatly. The territory was a volatile combination of racial tension and extreme state power, as it had not yet joined the American union, which wouldn't happen until 1959. Hawaii did not have the engrained segregation found within America at this time. Although stereotyping of minorities did occur, Hawaii is considered today to have been more progressive on the issue of race than mainland America. There was no established place for African Americans as Jim Crow segregation laws within American had kept white and black people in separate social spheres. Racially-driven stereotypes regarding African Americans did exist on the island and included rumours spread by non-African American soldiers that black soldiers had tails. For example, many white soldiers refused to recognise higher ranking black officers. The discrimination African Americans experienced within the military in Hawaii fueled their fight to see the "Double V" campaign succeed. However, their experience of life in a community that didn't have such established racial ideas demonstrates what a double victory could achieve.

Role of the press
African Americans had to create their own newspapers to spread information matters of importance and interest to their community, as white newspapers wouldn't include black issues.  These newspapers and their influence increased during the war as they had to relay information about the war to their readers. The black press emerged as a vibrant space for rhetorical expression and black social, political and cultural activity which was its primary function. It reflected the frustrations of the black community which were often more radical than the press itself. The press had a vital role in creating and spreading the idea of Double V in an effort to get more readers and black men to enroll in the army and support the war effort, as it was not a "white man's war" and if black people did not support the war effort and help America win it could be problematic to win equality back home. Since the black press had been criticised for insufficient patriotism, they created the Double V Campaign as a means to counter this idea and promote patriotism among African Americans despite the hypocrisy of the US government. However, newspapers such as the Chicago Defender and Pittsburgh Courier also detailed discrimination and racism which African American troops were facing abroad during the war. It was difficult to emphasize the importance of African American involvement in the war at a time where discrimination was apparent both in conscription and the wartime labour force.

Results of the campaign 
The Double V Campaign had limited success. While it promoted patriotism and support for the war effort among African Americans, especially as the Allies won the war, it fostered a narrow appreciation for the complexity of African American wartime situations, nor did it address or impact the underlying structure of America's systems of institutional racism. The campaign was also not a unifying force as many white, Southern newspapers and journalists criticised the slogan and characterised it as a dangerous revolution. The government tried to get the black press to cease agitation in an effort for greater rights. However it is also considered to be a turning point within African American history which led to unity among the black population in regards to achieving this double victory in the long run. The slogan and wartime protests marked a key development within black protest movements and aided in laying the groundwork for the future Civil Rights Movement. The campaign naturally died down by 1943 and the Pittsburgh Courier just mentioned the successes of the campaign from that point on; the campaign had not fully achieved its goal as discrimination was still legal after the war in America despite the efforts of African American soldiers. In this regard the White House has also failed to respond to progressive change within the African American population.

See also
African-American newspapers
American propaganda during World War II
Civil Rights Movement
Isaiah Bradley - fictional character from Marvel Comics uses shield with Double V campaign emblem
Louis Austin
Military history of African Americans

References

Further reading

External links
"Should I Sacrifice to Live 'Half American?'" written by James G. Thompson and published in the Pittsburgh Courier on January 31, 1942.

American propaganda during World War II
United States home front during World War II